Richard Burke, 4th Earl of Clanricarde (also Richard de Burgh) (1572 – 12 November 1635) was an Irish nobleman and politician.

He was the son of Ulick Burke, 3rd Earl of Clanricarde. Knighted in 1602 for his exploits as leader of the English cavalry during the Battle of Kinsale, he would later serve as Governor of Connaught from 1604 to 1616, and as a member of the Privy Council of Ireland. Having established himself as the largest and most influential landowner in Connacht, his later life was characterized by animosity between him and an increasingly hostile and acquisitive Dublin government.

Birth and origins 

Richard was born in 1572, the second but eldest surviving son of Ulick Burke and his wife Honora Burke. His father was the 3rd Earl of Clanricarde. His father's family was Old English and descended from William de Burgh (died 1206) who arrived in Ireland during the reign of King Henry II, and was the founder of the House of Burgh in Ireland.

His mother was a daughter of John Burke of Clogheroka and Tullyra, County Galway. Her family was a cadet branch of his father's line.

Richard had brothers and sisters who are listed in his father's article.

Early life 
Burke studied at Christ Church, Oxford from 1584 to 1598 and completed an M.A. degree. Burke fought for Queen Elizabeth I against the rebel Irish lords and their Spanish allies during the Nine Years' War.

Clanricarde 
On 20 May 1601 Burke succeeded his father as the 4th Earl of Clanricarde.

Marriage and children 
In 1603, Clanricarde married Frances Walsingham, the widow of Robert Devereux, 2nd Earl of Essex, daughter of Francis Walsingham.

 
Richard and Frances had one son:
Ulick, his successor

—and two daughters:
Mary, married Edward Butler of Ballinahinch, 6th son of James Butler, 9th Earl of Ormond as his 2nd wife
Honora (d. 1661), married 1st Garrat McCloghlan and 2ndly John Paulet, 5th Marquis of Winchester

Later life 
By 1633 he was not only one of the principal landowners in Ireland, but virtually all-powerful in County Galway. This aroused the resentment of the Dublin Government, which decided to use the method of empanelling juries to "find" defective titles, in order to recover the lands in question for the English Crown. In 1634 Strafford held such a jury in Portumna Castle. However the jury refused to deliver the desired verdict.

Death 
The treatment that Clanricarde experienced from the Lord Deputy of Ireland, Thomas Wentworth, was said to have hastened his death in November 1635. 

Wentworth, however, pointed to the Earl's advancing years as the obvious cause, and asked sarcastically whether he was to blame for a man being over sixty. The feud, which was continued by Clanricarde's son and heir, was in the long run very damaging to Strafford, who apparently did not reflect on the close connections that Clanricarde, through his wife, had with just that faction of the English nobility, the Rich-Devereux clan, who were most hostile to Strafford.

Arms

Notes and references

Notes

Citation

Sources 

 
 
  – Canonteign to Cutts (for Clanricarde)

Further reading 
 
 

 

 

1572 births
1635 deaths
16th-century Irish people
17th-century Irish people
Court of James VI and I
Earls of Clanricarde
Earls of St Albans
Richard
Irish soldiers
Burke, 4th Earl of Clanricarde, Richard
People of Elizabethan Ireland
Members of the Irish House of Lords
Peers of England created by James I